The Golden Gate is the strait connecting the Pacific Ocean to San Francisco Bay.

Golden Gate or Golden Gates may also refer to:

Places

Asia
 The accident zone within the Khumbu Icefall
 Kinmen, an island group governed by Taiwan

Europe
 Golden Gate (Constantinople), imperial entrance gate of city of Constantinople, present-day Istanbul, Turkey
 Golden Gate (Crimea), a natural rock formation
 Golden Gate (Gdańsk), in Poland
 Golden Gate, Kyiv, an 11th-century-built entrance gate tower in Ukraine
 The nearby Kyiv Metro station Zoloti Vorota (Kyiv Metro)
 Golden Gate (Vladimir) (Zolotye Vorota), the main gate for the city of Vladimir (Russia) from 1158 to 1164

Middle East
 Golden Gate (Jerusalem), part of the Temple Mount in East Jerusalem
 Palace of the Golden Gate, the main Abbasid palace in the Round City of Baghdad

South Africa
 Golden Gate Highlands National Park, in the Free State province of South Africa

United States

San Francisco Bay area
 Golden Gate, Oakland, California, a neighborhood
 Golden Gate Bridge, which extends across the Golden Gate strait
 Golden Gate National Recreation Area, a national park in the San Francisco Bay Area
 Golden Gate Park, in San Francisco

Other places in the U.S.
 Golden Gate, Florida, a CDP in Collier County, Florida
 Golden Gate, Martin County, Florida, an unincorporated community and the location of the historic Golden Gate Building built in 1925
 Golden Gate, Illinois
 Golden Gate Canyon, in Yellowstone National Park
 Golden Gate Canyon State Park, a Colorado State Park

Art, entertainment, and media

Film and television 
 Golden Gate (1981 film), a 1981 Warner Bros. Discovery TV movie
 Golden Gate (film), a 1994 film directed by John Madden
 Golden Gate (soundtrack), the soundtrack to the 1994 film
 Golden Gate (television), a Slovak television show with Braňo Holiček
 Golden Gate, a 1994 TV movie starring David James Elliott

Literature
 The Golden Gate (MacLean novel), a 1976 novel by Alistair MacLean
 The Golden Gate (Seth novel), a 1986 novel by Vikram Seth

Music
 Golden Gate Quartet, a 1934 gospel quartet
 "Golden Gate", a 1928 song by Al Jolson
 Golden Gates, a 1989 EP by Diamond Rexx

Video games
 Golden Gate (video game), a 1997 video game

Transport
 SS Golden Gate (1851), a passenger ship operated by the Pacific Mail Steamship Company, that burned and stranded on July 27, 1862
 Golden Gate (train), a named passenger train operated by the Santa Fe railroad, starting in 1938
 Golden Gate Transit, a bus and ferry operator centered on Marin County, California

Other uses
 Golden Gate Cemetery (disambiguation) 
 Golden Gate Baptist Theological Seminary in Mill Valley, California
 Golden Gate Capital, a private equity buyout firm headquartered in San Francisco, California
 Golden Gate Hotel and Casino, in Las Vegas
 Golden Gates, Eaton Hall at Eaton Hall, Cheshire, England
 Oracle GoldenGate, a software for ETL
 2016 United States election interference by Russia, called "Goldengate" in reference to Watergate